The 2010 Asian Wrestling Championships were held at the Indira Gandhi Arena, New Delhi, India. The event took place from 12 to 16 May 2010.

Medal table

Team ranking

Medal summary

Men's freestyle

Men's Greco-Roman

Women's freestyle

Participating nations 
231 competitors from 19 nations competed.

 (21)
 (16)
 (21)
 (14)
 (21)
 (4)
 (21)
 (17)
 (14)
 (12)
 (2)
 (2)
 (19)
 (7)
 (5)
 (10)
 (1)
 (16)
 (8)

References

External links
Official website
Results

Asia

Asian Wrestling Championships
W
International wrestling competitions hosted by India